Ludwig B. Erdahl (January 8, 1889 – May 31, 1969) was an American farmer and politician.

Erdahl was born in Frost, Faribault County, Minnesota and lived on a farm in Frost, Minnesota with his wife and family. He was involved with the Faribault County Fair. Erdahl served in the Minnesota House of Representatives from 1945 to 1962.

References

1889 births
1969 deaths
People from Faribault County, Minnesota
Farmers from Minnesota
Members of the Minnesota House of Representatives